HMS Epervier has been the name of more than one British Royal Navy ship, and may refer to:

 , sometimes spelled HMS Epervoir, a 16-gun brig-sloop captured from the French in 1797 and sold in 1801
 , a 16-gun brig-sloop launched in 1802, captured from the French in 1803, and sold in 1811.
 , an 18-gun brig-sloop launched in 1812 and captured by the United States Navy in 1814

Royal Navy ship names